The 1926 Columbus Tigers season was their seventh and final season in the league. The team improved on their previous output of 0–9, winning one game. They finished nineteenth in the league.

Schedule

Standings

References

Columbus Tigers seasons
Columbus Tigers
Columbus Tigers